The 1984 Campeonato Brasileiro Série B, officially, the Taça CBF, was the 7th edition of the Campeonato Brasileiro Série B. The championship was disputed by 32 clubs in a knockout tournament form. the champion would be promoted to the Third phase of the Copa Brasil of that year, and the champions, along with the runner up, would have berths in the First level championship of the next year. Uberlândia won the title, beating Remo in the finals.

First phase

Round of 16

Quarterfinals

Semifinals

Finals

References

Sources
 RSSSF

Campeonato Brasileiro Série B seasons
B